Esme is a genus of damselflies in the family Platycnemididae. This genus has three species. The following are the species:
Esme cyaneovittata
Esme longistyla (Nilgiri bambootail)
Esme mudiensis

References

Platycnemididae